The Biozentrum of the University of Basel specializes in basic molecular and biomedical research and teaching. Research includes the areas of cell growth and development, infection biology, neurobiology, structural biology and biophysics, and computational and systems biology. With 550 employees, the Biozentrum is the largest department at the University of Basel's Faculty of Science. It is home to 32 research groups with scientists from more than 40 nations.

History 
In 1971, at the time when the Biozentrum was founded, the concept of developing an interdisciplinary biological research facility was unique in Europe. Scientists from academy and industry as well as representatives of the Canton of Basel-Stadt promoted the Biozentrum's development.

In the winter semester 1972/73 the first students enrolled for the new "Biology II" curriculum. It encompassed a two-year foundation course in mathematics, physics and chemistry as well as a cycle of block courses – a new teaching format. In 1976 the first students received their diplomas. In 1978 the Biozentrum became a department of the University of Basel. In the same year, one of the founding professors, Werner Arber, was awarded the Nobel Prize for Physiology or Medicine for his discovery of the restriction enzymes.

With the incorporation of the Maurice E. Müller Institute in 1986, the Biozentrum became a competence center for high resolution electron microscopy. It also established a platform for nuclear magnetic resonance spectroscopy. Cooperation with the Institute for Immunology (Hofmann-La Roche)
 and the Friedrich Miescher Institute (Ciba/Geigy) became ever closer and networking more and more important: In 1996, what is now the "Center of Competence and Excellence in Neuroscience" was founded. Then "Neurex", the largest tri-national alliance of neurobiologists, was set up.  The "Basel Signalling Alliance", the "Neuroscience Network Basel", and the "Basel Stem Cell Network" followed. And finally, the Basel Translational Medicine Hub was established to further personalized medicine. The major areas of investigation were also extended: whereas into the 1990s the Biozentrum focused on Cell Growth & Development, Neurobiology and Structural Biology, it was at the beginning of the 21st century that Infection Biology and Computational & Systems Biology were added. Building up a range of Technology Core Facilities which offer highly sophisticated methods of investigation and analysis was also a priority during the last decade.

In 2021, the Biozentrum moved into a 73 m high research tower. The new building offers a state-of the art infrastructure that meets the needs of modern-day research as well as enough room for 400 researchers and 900 students. The Biozentrum is headed by its director Alexander F. Schier.

Research 
Research at the Biozentrum embraces a wide range of topics, however one main focus all the research groups share is a strong interest to understand the molecular organization of living organisms.

The major areas of research are concerned with the structure and function of macromolecules, the wiring of regulatory circuits, and the general principles underlying complex biological systems and their dynamic interactions.

Currently, the research groups of the Biozentrum are grouped into five major areas of investigation: Growth & Development, Infection Biology, Neurobiology, Structural Biology & Biophysics and Computational & Systems Biology.

Modern research increasingly depends on sophisticated technologies, notably in the fields of genomics, proteomics, imaging, and data analysis. To meet this challenge, the Biozentrum has established a number of so-called Technology Platforms. It has facilities for electron and light microscopy, cell imaging and nanoanalytics, proteomics, biophysics, FACS (Fluorescence Activated Cell Sorting) and Research IT. A microarray and a quantitative genomics facility are being shared with other regional research institute

Degrees awarded 
The courses of studies in molecular biology at the Biozentrum are characterized by the early exposure of the students to current research, the offer of all research areas and methods relevant to molecular biology, a modern technical infrastructure and the practical-work-oriented supervision.

BSc Major in Molecular Biology 
The bachelor's degree program in Molecular Biology encompasses one year of basic studies followed by two years of immersion in more specialized topics. In the first year, knowledge in mathematics, physics, general chemistry and the basic principles of biology are acquired. In the second year, students attend courses on biochemistry, developmental biology, genetics, human physiology, immunology, molecular microbiology, neurobiology, structural biology and biophysical chemistry. The third year of study has a practical orientation: in four six-week block courses the students actively engage in research.

BSc Major in Computational Biology 
The bachelor's degree program in Computational Sciences leading to a Major in Computational Biology also starts with one year of basic studies in mathematics, physics and chemistry and courses in computer science. In the second year mathematics and computer science are combined with the basic principles of molecular biology. Two six-week block courses with theoretical and experimental content as well as two research projects are part of the program of the third academic year.

MSc in Molecular Biology 
The prerequisite for admission to the master's degree in Molecular Biology is a "Bachelor of Science in Biology" with a "Major in Molecular Biology", in some cases a "Major in Integrative Biology", or a "Bachelor of Science in Computational Sciences" with a "Major in Computational Biology". In general, the program takes three semesters to complete. Students concentrate principally on an own research project. They work at least ten months in the laboratory.

PhD program 
The PhD program builds on a university degree in biology or related discipline and requires the student to engage in an independent research project within a period of three to four years. The program is completed by writing a thesis. The students also receive practical training in the latest methods and techniques of molecular biology research and attend courses of the Graduate Teaching Program.

Postdoctoral 
To expand their knowledge and experience, young researchers often spend a few years in research groups abroad. Accordingly, postdoctoral researchers from all continents are working at the Biozentrum.

Notable people
The following notable people work or have worked at the Biozentrum:

Former chairs 
Since 1973 the Biozentrum has been led by a chair. In 2009, the position was changed to director. The following persons have occupied this position:

References

External links 
 

 
University of Basel